The Charlotte Court House Historic District is a national historic district located at Charlotte Court House, Charlotte County, Virginia.  The district includes 46 contributing buildings, 2 contributing sites, 3 contributing structures, and 2 contributing objects in Charlotte Court House.  The district is centered on the separately listed Charlotte County Courthouse.  Other notable buildings include the former county jail (1936), Brick Tavern (1820), Charlotte County Farm Bureau building, St. John's Masonic Lodge (1852), Charlotte County Public Library (1810, 1836), Village Presbyterian Church and cemetery (1835), Charlotte Court House United Methodist Church (1841), Diamond Hill (c. 1840), Villeview (c. 1820, 1832), W. B. Ramsey House (c. 1850), Charlotte County Elementary School (1908), and Randolph-Henry High School (1939–1940).

It was listed on the National Register of Historic Places in 1995.

References

Historic districts on the National Register of Historic Places in Virginia
National Register of Historic Places in Charlotte County, Virginia
Buildings and structures in Charlotte County, Virginia